Dong Lu is a Chinese paralympic swimmer, who won gold and silver medals at the 2012 Summer Paralympics and a silver medal at the 2016 Summer Paralympics. She got 38.28 seconds on 50m butterfly. At the 2020 Summer Paralympics she won four gold medals with three world record. Lu lost both her arms after being hit by a car at age six.

Swimming career
During her career, Dong has received the May 1st Labour Medal, the May 4th Youth Medal and has been named a March 8 Red Banner Pacesetter in the People's Republic of China.

Major achievements:

WR: World Record
 2012: Won gold at the 2012 Paralympics in London in the Women's 100 metre backstroke S6, and silver in the Women's 50m butterfly S6.
 2016: Won silver in the Women's 100 metre backstroke S6 at the 2016 Rio de Janeiro Paralympics.
 2021 Won Gold in the Mixed 4 × 50 metre freestyle relay 20pts alongside team members Zhang Li 36.22, Toe Zheng 1:06.70, Yuan Weiyi 1:38.08, Lu Dong 2:15.49 with comdined team WR 2:15.49 at the 2020 Summer Paralympics in Tokyo, Japan. Won Gold in the Women's 50 metre butterfly S5 with WR 39.54. Won Gold in the Women's 50 metre backstroke S5 with WR 37.18.

References

Living people
Swimmers at the 2016 Summer Paralympics
Medalists at the 2016 Summer Paralympics
Swimmers at the 2020 Summer Paralympics
Medalists at the 2020 Summer Paralympics
Paralympic silver medalists for China
Paralympic gold medalists for China
Paralympic swimmers of China
Chinese female butterfly swimmers
Swimmers at the 2012 Summer Paralympics
Medalists at the 2012 Summer Paralympics
S6-classified Paralympic swimmers
Chinese female backstroke swimmers
Paralympic medalists in swimming
Chinese amputees
1991 births